Jonathan Nichols (born March 26, 1981)  is a former American football placekicker. Nichols won the Lou Groza Award in 2003, given to the best kicker in college football.  Nichols played for the University of Mississippi Rebels.

References

Living people
Ole Miss Rebels football players
American football placekickers
1981 births
Place of birth missing (living people)